In Greek mythology, Licymnius was a good friend of Heracles' and an illegitimate son of Electryon, King of Tiryns and Mycenae in the Argolid (which makes him half-brother of Alcmene, mother of Heracles). His mother is given as Mideia, a Phrygian woman. One source mentions Alco (Ἀλκώ) as his sister.

Mythology 
Licymnius was the only one of Electryon's sons to return home after the unsuccessful war against the Taphians and Teleboans. Licymnius married Perimede, daughter of Alcaeus and sister of Amphitryon, and became the father of Melas, Argius and Oeonus. Licymnius accompanied Amphitryon when the latter was expelled from the Argolid and fled to Thebes. 

According to one story, found in the Iliad, he was accidentally killed in his old age by Heracles' son Tlepolemus, when the latter was beating his servant with a stick and Licymnius ran in between (or else Tlepolemus and Licymnius had a quarrel over a certain matter). Pausanias mentions his tomb in Argos.

Notes

References 

 Diodorus Siculus, The Library of History translated by Charles Henry Oldfather. Twelve volumes. Loeb Classical Library. Cambridge, Massachusetts: Harvard University Press; London: William Heinemann, Ltd. 1989. Vol. 3. Books 4.59–8. Online version at Bill Thayer's Web Site
 Diodorus Siculus, Bibliotheca Historica. Vol 1-2. Immanel Bekker. Ludwig Dindorf. Friedrich Vogel. in aedibus B. G. Teubneri. Leipzig. 1888–1890. Greek text available at the Perseus Digital Library.
 Homer, The Iliad with an English Translation by A.T. Murray, Ph.D. in two volumes. Cambridge, MA., Harvard University Press; London, William Heinemann, Ltd. 1924. Online version at the Perseus Digital Library.
 Homer, Homeri Opera in five volumes. Oxford, Oxford University Press. 1920. Greek text available at the Perseus Digital Library.
 Pausanias, Description of Greece with an English Translation by W.H.S. Jones, Litt.D., and H.A. Ormerod, M.A., in 4 Volumes. Cambridge, MA, Harvard University Press; London, William Heinemann Ltd. 1918. Online version at the Perseus Digital Library
 Pausanias, Graeciae Descriptio. 3 vols. Leipzig, Teubner. 1903.  Greek text available at the Perseus Digital Library.
 Pindar, Odes translated by Diane Arnson Svarlien. 1990. Online version at the Perseus Digital Library.
 Pindar, The Odes of Pindar including the Principal Fragments with an Introduction and an English Translation by Sir John Sandys, Litt.D., FBA. Cambridge, MA., Harvard University Press; London, William Heinemann Ltd. 1937. Greek text available at the Perseus Digital Library.
 Pseudo-Apollodorus, The Library with an English Translation by Sir James George Frazer, F.B.A., F.R.S. in 2 Volumes, Cambridge, MA, Harvard University Press; London, William Heinemann Ltd. 1921. Online version at the Perseus Digital Library. Greek text available from the same website.
Kings in Greek mythology
Children of Ares
Demigods in classical mythology
Perseid dynasty